St Thomas Aquinas Secondary School is a Catholic secondary school in Jordanhill, Glasgow. The current head teacher is Claire McInally, who took over at the beginning of the 2019-2020 session. The previous head teacher was Andrew McSorley who headed the school for 13 years from 2006-2019.

Re-building
 
The original school was built in the 1950s, and at the end of the 2001/2002 school year the original building was demolished to make way for a new one. During the rebuilding works staff and pupils were temporarily based at Woodside School, close to the city's Anderston area. The new facility consists of the Abbey Building and the Mitre Building, and was built as part of Glasgow's PPP school building programme. The new building was completed in 2003 and the school was officially opened on 3 December 2004 by the then Education convener of Glasgow City Council, Steven Purcell, a former pupil. The new school is one of the largest Roman Catholic schools in the city and has a capacity of over a thousand pupils.

The expressive arts

In 2007 the school produced a version of Romeo and Juliet which received national media attention as it brought to life issues relating to sectarianism.

In 2008 ten St Thomas' pupils were chosen to represent Scotland at the World Schools' Orienteering Championships.

Notable former pupils

James McAvoy, Actor
Tosh McKinlay, Footballer
Joseph Andrew Mclean, Filmmaker
Hudson Mohawke, Producer and DJ
Graeme Pearson, Politician, Member of Parliament
Steven Purcell, Politician
Carol Monaghan, Politician

References

External links
 School Website
 The School's most recent HMIe report

Catholic secondary schools in Glasgow
1958 establishments in Scotland
Jordanhill